The College of Engineering is a leading private school for engineering and architecture at Korea University in Seoul, South Korea.

Departments
 Materials Science and Engineering
 Electrical and Electronic Engineering
 Industrial and Management Engineering
 Chemical and Biological Engineering
 Civil, Environmental and Architectural Engineering
 Architecture
 Mechanical Engineering   
 Semiconductor Engineering (SK Hynix)
 Communication Engineering (Samsung Electronics)
 Convergence Energy Engineering

Korea University schools